Partlow Mountain is a summit in Herkimer County, New York in the Adirondack Mountains. It is located north-northwest of Little Rapids in the Town of Webb. Greenfield Mountain is located east of Partlow Mountain.

References

Mountains of Herkimer County, New York
Mountains of New York (state)